An estrogen conjugate is a conjugate of an endogenous estrogen. They occur naturally in the body as metabolites of estrogens and can be reconverted back into estrogens. They serve as a circulating reservoir for estrogen, particularly in the case of orally administered pharmaceutical estradiol. Estrogen conjugates include sulfate and/or glucuronide conjugates of estradiol, estrone, and estriol:

 Sulfated:
 Estrone 3-sulfate (E1S)
 Estradiol 3-sulfate (E2S, E2-3S) and estradiol 17β-sulfate (E2-17S)
 Estriol 3-sulfate (E3S)
 Estradiol 3,17β-disulfate (E2DS)
 Glucuronidated:
 Estrone 3-glucuronide (E1-G)
 Estradiol 3-glucuronide (E2-3G) and estradiol 17β-glucuronide (E2-17G)
 Estriol 3-glucuronide (E3-3G), estriol 16α-glucuronide (E3-16G)
 Mixed:
 Estradiol 3-glucuronide 17β-sulfate (E2-3G-17βS)
 Estradiol 3-sulfate 17β-glucuronide (E2-3S-17βG)
 Estriol 3-sulfate 16α-glucuronide (E3-3S-16G)

Estrogen conjugates are conjugated at the C3, C16α, and/or C17β positions, where hydroxyl groups are available.

Estrogen conjugates have been used as pharmaceutical estrogens, as in estrone sulfate as estropipate (piperazine estrone sulfate) and in conjugated estrogens (Premarin) and conjugated estriol (Progynon, Emmenin).

See also
 Catechol estrogen
 Lipoidal estradiol
 Steroid sulfate

References

Estranes
Estrogens
Human metabolites
Steroid hormones